George Mordue (born 1914) was an English professional footballer who played as a right half.

Career
Born in South Shields, Mordue spent his early career with Washington Colliery, Wolverhampton Wanderers, Bournemouth and Boscombe Athletic and Aldershot. He joined Bradford City in October 1938, making 7 league appearances, before being released by the club in 1939.

Sources

References

1914 births
Year of death missing
Footballers from South Shields
English footballers
Washington F.C. players
Wolverhampton Wanderers F.C. players
AFC Bournemouth players
Aldershot F.C. players
Bradford City A.F.C. players
English Football League players
Association football wing halves